Ovyursky District (Övür kojuun) is an administrative and municipal district (raion, or kozhuun), one of the seventeen in the Tuva Republic, Russia. It is located in the southwest of the republic. Its administrative center is the rural locality (a selo) of Khandagayty. Population:  7,930 (2002 Census);  The population of Khandagayty accounts for 45.7% of the district's total population.

References

Notes

Sources

Districts of Tuva